Alloclita delozona is a moth in the family Cosmopterigidae. It is found from Egypt, Saudi Arabia and the United Arab Emirates to Pakistan and India.

Adults have been recorded from February to March in Saudi Arabia.

References

Moths described in 1919
Antequerinae
Moths of Africa
Moths of Asia